Adrien Broner vs. Marcos Maidana, billed as Danger Zone, was a professional boxing match, contested for Broner's WBA welterweight title. The match was held at the Alamodome in San Antonio, Texas. Maidana won the fight by a unanimous decision.

References

Boxing matches
2013 in boxing
Boxing in Texas
Events in San Antonio
Sports competitions in San Antonio
2013 in sports in Texas
December 2013 sports events in the United States